The Atlantis Music Prize is a music award annually given to the best full-length album from Newfoundland and Labrador, Canada, based only on artistic merit, regardless of genre,  sales or record label.  The award, established in 2008 by St. John's-based alternative newspaper The Scope, includes a certificate prize of $1000. The award is modeled after the Polaris Music Prize for all of Canada (which in turn is modeled after the Mercury Music Prize in the United Kingdom).

Jury and selection process
No entry fee is required for submission, and all genres of music are included. A shortlist of 10 albums is compiled by more than 30 judges from the area, who each choose five albums, and a second panel of six judges selects the winner at the Atlantis Music Prize Gala.

Past winners and nominees

Atlantis Music Prize

Borealis Music Prize

See also

 Polaris Music Prize (Canada)
 Choice Music Prize (Ireland)
 Mercury Music Prize (United Kingdom)
 Prix Constantin (France)
 Shortlist Prize (United States)

References

External links
Official site

Canadian music awards
Awards established in 2008
Newfoundland and Labrador music
2008 establishments in Newfoundland and Labrador